The 2008–09 Grand Prix of Figure Skating Final was the senior and junior Grand Prix Final competition of the 2008–09 season. It was the culminating competition of the 2008–09 ISU Grand Prix of Figure Skating, a senior-level international invitational competition, and the 2008–09 ISU Junior Grand Prix, a junior-level international competition. The junior and senior finals were hosted together for the first time.

Skaters had earned points towards qualifying for the senior Grand Prix Final at the 2008 Skate America, the 2008 Skate Canada International, the 2008 Cup of China, the 2008 Trophée Eric Bompard, the 2008 Cup of Russia, and the 2008 NHK Trophy. Skaters had earned points towards qualifying for the junior Grand Prix Final at each of the eight Junior Grand Prix events. The six highest ranking skaters/teams from the Grand Prix series and the eight highest ranking skaters/teams from the Junior Grand Prix met at the Grand Prix Final.

Hosted by the Korea Skating Union, the Grand Prix Final was held in Goyang, South Korea from December 10 to 14, 2008. Medals were awarded in the disciplines of men's singles, ladies' singles, pair skating, and ice dancing on the senior and junior levels.

Unlike the other events in both series, there was no compulsory dance portion of the competition. Ice dancers were ranked in the original dance starting order in reverse order of their qualification to the Final.

Schedule
All times are Korea Standard Time (UTC+9).

 Thursday, December 11
 16:00 Opening ceremony
 16:45 Junior ice dancing - Original dance
 18:10 Junior men - Short program
 19:35 Junior pairs - Short program
 21:00 Junior ladies - Short program
 Friday, December 12
 14:24 Junior pairs - Free skating
 16:00 Junior men - Free skating
 18:00 Senior ice dancing - Original dance
 19:10 Senior men - Short program
 20:15 Senior ladies - Short program
 21:20 Senior pairs - Short program
 Saturday, December 13
 14:00 Junior ice dancing - Free dance
 15:25 Junior ladies - Free skating
 17:30 Senior ice dancing - Free dance
 18:50 Senior men - Free skating
 20:05 Senior ladies - Free skating
 21:45 Senior pairs - Free skating
Sunday, December 14
 14:00 Gala exhibition

Qualifiers

Senior-level qualifiers
The following skaters qualified for the Grand Prix Final, in order of qualification.

Junior-level qualifiers
The following skaters qualified for the 2008–09 Junior Grand Prix Final, in order of qualification.

 Michal Březina, the second qualifier in the men's event, withdrew on December 1. Artur Gachinski, the first alternate, replaced him.
 Piper Gilles / Zachary Donohue, the fifth qualifiers in the ice dancing event, withdrew due to an injury to Gilles. Marina Antipova / Artem Kudashev, the first alternates, replaced them.
 Ekaterina Sheremetieva / Mikhail Kuznetsov, the first alternates in the pairs event, withdrew on December 1.

Senior-level results

Men

Ladies

This was Mao Asada’s second win.

Pairs

Ice dancing

Junior-level results

Men

Ladies

Pairs

Ice dancing

References

External links

 Official site
 
 
 

2008 in figure skating
Grand Prix of Figure Skating Final
Grand Prix of Figure Skating Final
Grand Prix of Figure Skating Final
ISU Junior Grand Prix
International figure skating competitions hosted by South Korea
Sports competitions in Goyang
2008 in youth sport
2009 in youth sport